Lars Aslan Rasmussen (born 31 October 1978 in Copenhagen) is a Danish politician, who is a member of the Folketing for the Social Democrats political party. He entered parliament on 4 April 2016 when Helle Thorning-Schmidt resigned her seat.

Political career
In the 2015 Danish general election Rasmussen had been elected as a substitute for the Social Democrats in the Copenhagen constituency. When Helle Thorning-Schmidt resigned her seat on 4 April 2016, Rasmussen entered parliament and took over the seat. He ran in the 2019 election and was elected directly into parliament with 4,279 votes cast for him.

References

External links 
 Biography on the website of the Danish Parliament (Folketinget)

1978 births
Living people
Politicians from Copenhagen
Social Democrats (Denmark) politicians
Members of the Folketing 2015–2019
Members of the Folketing 2019–2022